Dibutyltin oxide, or dibutyloxotin, is an organotin compound with the chemical formula (C4H9)2SnO.  It is a colorless solid that, when pure, is insoluble in organic solvents.  It is used as a reagent and a catalyst.

Structure
The structure of diorganotin oxides depends on the size of the organic groups.  For smaller substituents, the materials are assumed to be polymeric with five-coordinate Sn centers and 3-coordinate oxide centers.  The result is a net of interconnected four-membered Sn2O2 and eight-membered Sn4O4 rings.  The presence of pentacoordinate Sn centers is deduced from 119Sn NMR spectroscopy and 119Sn Mössbauer spectroscopy.

Uses
In organic synthesis, among its many applications, it is particularly useful in directing regioselective O-alkylation, acylation, and sulfonation reactions for diols and polyol. DBTO has been used in the regioselective tosylation (a specific type of sulfonation) of certain polyols to selectively tosylate primary alcohols and exocyclic alcohols over more sterically-hindered alcohols. It also finds use as a transesterification catalyst.

Dibutyltin compounds, such as dibutyltin dilaurate are widely used curing catalysts for the production of silicones and polyurethanes.

See also
Otera's catalyst

References

Organotin compounds
Four-membered rings
Eight-membered rings
Two-dimensional nanomaterials
Tin(IV) compounds
Butyl compounds